Bradyrhizobium subterraneum is a nitrogen-fixing bacterium from the genus of Bradyrhizobium which has been isolated from the effective nodules of the peanut Arachis hypogaea.

References

Nitrobacteraceae
Bacteria described in 2015